Mounir Troudi (b. 1968) is a jazz and Sufi music singer from Tunisia.

Mounir grew up in Tunis, and he received his diploma  Arabic music in 1998. He made his debut with Fadhel Jaziri and his show Hadhra in 1994, and in the early 2000s he formed Nagouz. He has also appeared in several albums with jazz trumpet player Erik Truffaz.

In 2010 he released his album Tawassol.

Mounir announced Bach on the bac' as his next project in June 2018.

 Notable Performances 
 1994 : Hadhra 2000 : Tabarka Jazz Festival

 Albums 
 2002 : Mantis (with Erik Truffaz)
 2005 : Saloua (with Erik Truffaz)
 2010 : Tawassol 2014 : Songs from a Stolen Spring'' (compilation)
 Bach on the bac

References

External links 
 
 Official MySpace page of Mounir Troudi

Tunisian musicians
Male jazz musicians
Living people
1968 births
Date of birth missing (living people)